Tunkhannock is a borough in Wyoming County, Pennsylvania, 31 miles (50 km) northwest of Wilkes-Barre. In the past, lumbering was carried on extensively. Today, many residents are employed by the Procter & Gamble plant in nearby Washington Township. As of the 2020 census, the borough population was 1,766. It is the county seat of Wyoming County.  Tunkhannock is in the Scranton–Wilkes-Barre–Hazleton, PA Metropolitan Statistical Area.

The name Tunkhannock is derived from the Minsi-Len'api term Ptuk'hanna'unk, which means "Bend-in-river-place," especially to the town's west, upstream at the radical bend called "The Neck." Modern Tunkhannock, Wyoming County,  The Tunkhannock Historic District, bounded by Tioga, Pine, and Harrison Streets, and Wyoming Avenue, were added to the National Register of Historic Places in August 2005.

General information
Area Code: 570 Exchanges: 836 and 996
ZIP code: 18657
Main streets/roads: Route 29 (Bridge Street), Business Route 6 (Tioga Street), Route 6 (Tunkhannock Bypass / Grand Army of the Republic Hwy), Route 92
Voting Information: four wards (numbered 1,2,3,4); elected Borough Council

Geography
Tunkhannock is located at  (41.540836, -75.947703).

According to the U.S. Census Bureau, the borough has a total area of 0.9 square mile (2.3 km2), all  land.

Transportation
Skyhaven Airport is a public use airport located one nautical mile (1.85 km) south of the central business district of Tunkhannock, in neighboring Eaton Township.

Demographics

As of the census of 2010, there were 1,836 people, 817 households, and 447 families residing in the borough. The racial makeup of the borough was 95.9% White, 0.9% African American, 0.2% Native American, 1.1% Asian, 0.1% Pacific Islander, 0.35% from other races, and 1.45% from two or more races. 1.3% of the population were Hispanic or Latino of any race.

There were 817 households, out of which 25.3% had children under the age of 18 living with them, 38.7% were married couples living together, 12% had a female householder with no husband present, and 45.3% were non-families. 40.4% of all households were made up of individuals, and 20% had someone living alone who was 65 years of age or older. The average household size was 2.15 and the average family size was 2.92.

In the borough the population was spread out, with 22.3% under the age of 18, 57% from 18 to 64, and 20.7% who were 65 years of age or older. The median age was 43.5 years.

The median income for a household in the borough was $37,071, and the median income for a family was $56,250. Males had a median income of $43,098 versus $31,313 for females. The per capita income for the borough was $23,110. 2.4% of the population and 6.9% of families were below the poverty line. Out of the total population, none of those under the age of 18 and 8.6% of those 65 and older were living below the poverty line.

Government

The borough is represented by a council-manager government.

Executive

Council

Culture
The Wyoming County Historical Society and Genealogical Library offers a major source of research material. The collection includes numerous books on New England ancestry, newspapers dating back to 1797 and census records for Wyoming and surrounding counties from 1790 to 1930. Also on file are records for over 90 area cemeteries and  other local history information.

In 1941 artist Ethel Ashton painted on oil on canvas mural, Defenders of the Wyoming Country-1778, for the local post office. It depicted a battle by American settlers and local Native American tribes during the year leading up to Sullivan's March. In 1998, the mural was restored and a documentary was made about it in 2009.

Situated along the Susquehanna River, Tunkhannock was impacted by Hurricane Agnes in June, 1972. 
 
Tunkhannock is the home of the Northern Tier Symphony Orchestra, under the direction of Conductor Robert Helmacy. Tunkhannock is listed as one of the top 10 places to "get away from it all" 

In the center of town, the Dietrich Theater serves as a cultural attraction, with 4 screens showing popular new releases as well as hosting film festivals and miscellaneous community activities.

Notable people
 John Brisbin U.S. Congressman (1851)
 Frank Charles Bunnell - U.S. Congressman (1872–1873, 1885–1889)
 Charles E. Dietrich - U.S. Congressman (1935–1937)
 Glenn J. Frey - professional football player
 Joe Glenn - Major League Baseball player
 Robyn Griggs - American actress (1973-2022)
 Benjamin F. Harding - U.S. Senator from Oregon (1862–1865)
 Jim Hudock - Dean Smith's first basketball captain at the University of North Carolina
 Mike Hudock - professional football player
 Edwin J. Jorden - U.S. Congressman (1895)
 Mike Papi - professional baseball player (Cleveland Indians organization)
 Christopher Ries - Glass Sculptor
 Donald Sherwood - U.S. Congressman (1999–2007)
 Harold Rainsford Stark -U.S.  Naval Admiral, Chief of Naval Operations 1939-1942 (1880-1972)
 Walter Tewksbury - 1900 Summer Olympics Gold Medalist
 Robert F. Wilner - Episcopalian Suffragan Bishop of the Philippines

References

External links

 Tunkhannock Borough official website

Pennsylvania populated places on the Susquehanna River
County seats in Pennsylvania
Populated places established in 1790
Boroughs in Wyoming County, Pennsylvania